Iiro Seppänen (born July 13, 1975) is a Finnish producer, director and author. After successful careers as a master magician and professional BASE jumper, Seppänen turned his talents to filmmaking and since 2005 has produced two award-winning documentaries (The Ground is the Limit and Journey to the Center), more than 50 hours of prime time TV entertainment, the CBS transmedia micro-series The Courier,  and executive produced the 2011 Robert De Niro film, Freelancers. 

In 2009, Seppänen and Chinese film executive Frank Yang co-founded Pan-Pacific Entertainment, a Hollywood-based film investment, consulting and production company created to manage an independent motion picture fund, produce independent live-action and animated feature films, and provide transmedia planning and consulting. Pan-Pacific is principally engaged in the financing, production, co-production and worldwide distribution of these properties.

Personal life
Seppänen was in a relationship with model Vera Jordanova for five years. He lived in Los Angeles before moving to Cape Town, South Africa, where he lives with his South African wife Julia, with whom he has a daughter born in 2019. The family is going to move to London in summer 2020.

References

Further reading

External links

1975 births
Living people
Finnish skeptics
Finnish skydivers
Finnish magicians
Autobiographers
Finnish expatriates in England
Finnish expatriates in South Africa
Finnish expatriates in the United States